Gotta Go is a Trey Songz song.

Gotta Go may also refer to:

Music

Songs
"Gotta Go" (Sunmi song), a song recorded by South Korean singer Sunmi released in 2020
"Gotta Go" (Chungha song), a song recorded by South Korean singer Chungha released in 2019
"Gotta Go", a song by Jenny Berggren from her 2010 album My Story
"Gotta Go", song by Lynyrd Skynyrd from Best of the Rest 1982, and the B-side of "I've Been Your Fool"
"Gotta Go (Can't Wage a War)", song by Kingdom Come from their 1989 album In Your Face

See also
"Gotta Go My Own Way", a song on the High School Musical 2 soundtrack
"If You Gotta Go, Go Now", a song written by Bob Dylan in 1964